Ameromassaria is a genus of fungi within the class Sordariomycetes. The relationship of this taxon to other taxa within the class is unknown (incertae sedis). This is a monotypic genus, containing the single species Ameromassaria japonica.

References

Sordariomycetes enigmatic taxa
Monotypic Sordariomycetes genera